The Croatian Conservative Party ( or HKS) was a conservative political party in Croatia. Last president of the party was Marijan Pavliček. It was founded on 20 November 2014.

It joined the Alliance of European Conservatives and Reformists (now Alliance of Conservatives and Reformists in Europe) in May 2015.  Its sole MEP has been a member of the European Conservatives and Reformists since the party's foundation.

On October 2, 2021, a unification assembly was held in Croatia's capital Zagreb. During the assembly it was announced, that three smaller conservative and right-wing parties (Croatian Conservative Party, Hrast-Movement for Successful Croatia and the Generation of Renewal) will become defunct to merge and work together as the Croatian Sovereignists.

Election history

Legislative

European parliament

References

External links
  Croatian Conservative Party official website

Conservative parties in Croatia
European Conservatives and Reformists member parties
Alliance of Conservatives and Reformists in Europe member parties
Political parties established in 2014
2014 establishments in Croatia
2021 disestablishments in Croatia
Right-wing populism in Croatia
Right-wing populist parties
National conservative parties